Iain Philip Stables is a New Zealand radio disc jockey. In the past Stables worked on various radio stations across New Zealand beginning his radio career on Radio Windy in Wellington at the age of 14. As well as radio, Stables has appeared in several television roles including being the 'bad boy' judge on NZ Idol Series 3 in 2006. He has had regular TV guest appearances on the former Good Morning Show, Shock Treatment TV2, main judge/personality on TVNZ's One Night Only (10 eps) which was an entertainment showcase version of Top Town on TV2, 2010/11. As of 2021, Stables owns the Ski FM radio network and a number of other media assets.

Career
During his radio career Stables worked for a total of 16 radio stations in New Zealand and was fired from four. In the past Stables worked on two of New Zealand's largest radio networks ZM between 2003 and 2008 and before this on opposition station The Edge FM between 1995 and 2002. It was at The Edge that Stables performed most of his stunts and his name became well known across New Zealand. 

On 24 February 2008, Stables announced to the Sunday News that he was no longer working for ZM, and has been taken off the air.
After leaving ZM, Stables appeared on Jono's New Show on C4, and was appointed a role at Sky TV NZ where he worked as a presentation director. In 2008 Stables appeared on the TVNZ show Shock Treatment where he was sent to Jamaica to partake in military training. However, he left the show after only one day - the first Kiwi celebrity to quit the show. Stables also appeared on the TVNZ show The Sitting, which screens on TVNZ 6, on this show Stables spoke about himself while Painter Marty Welch painted Stables portrait.

In November 2009 Stables was approached to head independent CHR station Hit Radio X105, however Hit Radio X105 went off the air on 14 September 2010 primarily due to director conflict. Stables was due to begin working on Radio Hauraki on 11 October 2010. However, this was delayed after Stables became involved in a physical confrontation with a check-in employee of the airline Jetstar after a verbal altercation. Stables was stood down from his position following the fight with the Jetstar employee. A month later Stables contract with Radio Hauraki was terminated.

In 2013 Stables purchased the assets of the  insolvent Ski FM(Ruapehu Radio Ltd) and Central media group NZ ltd was formed. The stations reach was quadrupled and put into Taupō, Tūrangi and Whanganui, in addition to its 31 year Ruapehu legacy areas. This expansion increased its potential listenership increase from 23,000 to just over 100,000. It was the reformatted and relaunched to a mainstream pop/top40 format becoming more visitor/tourist focused and less local. Stables also acquired a number of FM and AM radio broadcast frequencies in 2016/17 with several still "non-operative" across NZ or being leased to other operators. In 2016 Ski partnered with NZME and joined the iHeart Radio platform. Stables and his former mediaworks partner Danielle also have private media asset and financial interest in western Australian local provincial radio as well which includes digital outdoor advertising. 

In 2021 Stables was criticised for posting job advertisements for his Ruapehu-central north island radio station Ski FM that joked about sexual harassment in the workplace, including having 'sexual harassment Sundays.' Further, the advertisements also joked about not being an accessible workplace, and had racist overtures. After complaints, the job advertisements were edited and Ski FM issued an apology.

Stunts 
Stables' has a reputation for on-air stunts, many of which have landed him in trouble. Some of these include:
In October, 2001, Stables courted controversy after holding a "Kiss My Arse for a Backstage Pass" contest. Stables dropped his pants and got a woman to kiss his bottom in front of 10,000 people at Hamilton's Summer Jam Concert.
In February, 2002 Stables called Beach FM in Kapiti stating he was a Police Officer and had a traffic report to read out. When the announcer allowed Stables to read out his report on air, Stables told listeners if they are stuck in the traffic jam they can help pass the time by 'playing with themselves'.
In September, 2003, the Broadcasting Complaints Authority upheld a complaint against Stables for inciting "bus rage" while on air. The complaint came after Stables called for passengers to dance, rip up seats, or leave chewing gum on buses if they were angry with a bus company's service.
In February 2005, after Paul Holmes planted a new Pohutukawa Tree on One Tree Hill in Auckland which was later removed by the Auckland City Council, Stables decided to erect a Swingball Set on One Tree Hill as a replacement for the original tree that was cut down in 2000, the Swingball pole was mounted in 90 kg of concrete. Stables felt a Swingball Set was the fitting replacement for the tree that once stood in this location as the Swingball is a true Kiwi icon and could be enjoyed by generations to come. Auckland City Council removed the Swingball Set. In protest, ZM ran Swingball competitions all around New Zealand with mayors in various regions supporting the event

In July 2006, while judging NZ Idol, Stables told an applicant that she "was no good at singing but would make an excellent 'Shag'". The applicant complained about Stables remarks, and as a result, the organisers allowed the applicant through to the next round, but she was eliminated in the following round where Stables had been stood down from judging.
In January 2010, Stables assisted X105 workmate Warwick Slow into gatecrashing a party held for Prince William at Premier House in Wellington. The party was to show the Prince a true New Zealand barbecue and when Stables realised that "Sizzlers" (a brand of New Zealand sausages) weren't on the menu Stables sent workmate Slow to Premier House armed with a pack of Sizzlers and a loaf of Bread. Slow managed to gain entry by jumping the fence and was on the ground for eight minutes before being removed from the premises by Police. Stables conversed with Slow throughout the time via cellphone until the phone was confiscated by Police.

Legal issues 
In September 2000, Stables was sued for Defamation of Character by TV presenter April Ieremia for stating that he was married to her, on his profile page, on The Edge website. His comments included not only saying that he was married to April but also that he 'Did it with her on the TV2 bus'. Other comments on Stables profile page stated that Stables liked working for The Edge most because he could steal CDs to support his drug problem, and stated that when he grows up he would like to be the 'TV2 Bus Driver'.

In September 2000, Stables was convicted and fined $1100 after impersonating a detective from Interpol.  He called the Los Angeles police and claimed his co-workers Jason Reeves, Jay-Jay Feeney and Clarke Gayford were trying to enter the United States with kiwi eggs hidden in their "rear cavities". The trio were subsequently held for two hours at LA Airport, questioned and searched. Stables appeared in court wearing a Superman outfit, saying: "You can't put a Superhero in prison".

Following the 2010 termination at Radio Hauraki after the Jetstar incident, it was revealed that Stables had a clause in his contract stating it would be terminated if Stables became involved in any court action. The Jetstar employee was found not guilty of assaulting Stables, who was judged to be aggressive and abusive, and allegedly used a racist slur. During this court case, Stables had sought name suppression because of the effect it might have on his mental health, notably his Bipolar disorder, but this was application was rejected by the court. An industry source said Stables and The Radio Network (who owns Radio Hauraki) had come to an arrangement and no legal action ensued.

In 2012, Stables was acquitted in the Wellington District Court of assaulting his ex-partner's parents, was found guilty of assaulting his ex-partner's brother, and not tried on a charge of threatening to kill.

In 2022 Stables was fined after falling asleep at the wheel, and crashing into a mailbox.

Awards
Stables was the winner in the category Best Non-Breakfast Host or Hosts (Metropolitan) at the New Zealand Radio Awards in 2007. Stables created a stir with his offensive acceptance speech with remarks aimed at his former employer Canwest MediaWorks, Stables' speech prompted the Radio Broadcasters Association to adopt a Code of Conduct for all attending the awards including guidelines for acceptance speeches.

Albums
In 2003 ZM and Stables released their own album called Stables Label Volume 3. It is unknown if there ever was a Volume 1 or 2. The Album features parodies of popular songs created by Stables and other ZM announcers.

Notes and references

1972 births
Living people
New Zealand Idol
New Zealand radio presenters
New Zealand television presenters